There have been three baronetcies created for people with the surname Cayzer, each in the Baronetage of the United Kingdom and each for members of the same family .

The Cayzer Baronetcy, of Gartmore in the County of Perth, was created on 12 December 1904 for the businessman and Conservative Member of Parliament Charles William Cayzer, who had made his fortune in the shipping business. The Cayzer dynasty's shipping interests by the 1950s comprised the Clan Line Steamers (cargo) and Union Castle Steamship Co. (passengers). Sir Charles Cayzer represented Barrow-in-Furness in the House of Commons. The third Baronet sat as a Conservative Member of Parliament for Chester.

The First World War admirals Sir Charles Madden and Lord Jellicoe were the first baronet's sons-in-law. The late 2nd Earl Jellicoe was a grandson.

The Cayzer Baronetcy, of Roffey Park in the County of Sussex, was created on 17 January 1921 for August Bernard Tellefsen Cayzer, the third son of Sir Charles Cayzer, 1st Baronet, of Gartmore. His son, the second Baronet, was created a life peer as Baron Cayzer, of St Mary Axe in the City of London. However, on his death in 1999 both titles became extinct.

The Cayzer Baronetcy, of Tylney in the County of Southampton, was created on 29 January 1924 for the businessman and Conservative Member of Parliament Herbert Robin Cayzer, the fifth son of Sir Charles Cayzer, 1st Baronet, of Gartmore. In 1939, he was raised to the peerage as Baron Rotherwick, of Tylney in the County of Southampton. His grandson, the 3rd Baron and 3rd Baronet of Tylney, succeeded additionally (as 6th Baronet) to the Cayzer Baronetcy of Gartmore on 27 February 2012.

Cayzer baronets, of Gartmore (1904)

Sir Charles Cayzer, 1st Baronet (1843–1916)
Sir Charles William Cayzer, 2nd Baronet (1869–1917)
Sir Charles William Cayzer, 3rd Baronet (1896–1940)
Sir Nigel John Cayzer, 4th Baronet (1920–1943)
Sir James Arthur Cayzer, 5th Baronet (1931–2012)
Sir (Herbert) Robin Cayzer, 3rd Baron Rotherwick, 6th Baronet (born 1954)

Cayzer baronets, of Roffey Park (1921)
Sir August Bernard Tellefsen Cayzer, 1st Baronet (1876–1943)
Sir (William) Nicholas Cayzer, 2nd Baronet (1910–1999) (created Baron Cayzer in 1982) Extinct.

Cayzer baronets of Tylney (1924)
Sir Herbert Robin Cayzer, 1st Baron Rotherwick, 1st Baronet (1881–1958)
Sir Herbert Robin Cayzer, 2nd Baron Rotherwick, 2nd Baronet (1912–1996)
Sir (Herbert) Robin Cayzer, 3rd Baron Rotherwick, 3rd Baronet (born 1954)

See also
Caledonia Investments

References
Kidd, Charles, Williamson, David (editors). Debrett's Peerage and Baronetage (1990 edition). New York: St Martin's Press, 1990, 

Baronetcies in the Baronetage of the United Kingdom
Cayzer family
Extinct baronetcies in the Baronetage of the United Kingdom
British businesspeople in shipping